Jagdish Nayar is an Indian politician. He was elected to the Haryana Legislative Assembly from Hodal in the 2019 Haryana Legislative Assembly election as a member of the Bharatiya Janata Party.

References 

1970 births
Living people
Bharatiya Janata Party politicians from Haryana
People from Palwal district
Indian National Lok Dal politicians
Haryana MLAs 2019–2024